The 4th constituency of Bouches-du-Rhône is a French legislative constituency in Bouches-du-Rhône.

Geography 
The constituency covers the centre of the city of Marseille.

Historic representation

Election results

2022

 
 
 
 
 
 
 
|-
| colspan="8" bgcolor="#E9E9E9"|
|-

2017

2012

2007

|- style="background-color:#E9E9E9;text-align:center;"
! colspan="2" rowspan="2" style="text-align:left;" | Candidate
! rowspan="2" colspan="2" style="text-align:left;" | Party
! colspan="2" | 1st round
! colspan="2" | 2nd round
|- style="background-color:#E9E9E9;text-align:center;"
! width="75" | Votes
! width="30" | %
! width="75" | Votes
! width="30" | %
|-
| style="background-color:" |
| style="text-align:left;" | Henri Jibrayel
| style="text-align:left;" | Socialist Party
| PS
| 
| 25.82%
| 
| 57.41%
|-
| style="background-color:" |
| style="text-align:left;" | Bernard Susini
| style="text-align:left;" | Union for a Popular Movement
| UMP
| 
| 25.39%
| 
| 42.59%
|-
| style="background-color:" |
| style="text-align:left;" | Frédéric Dutoit
| style="text-align:left;" | Communist
| PCF
| 
| 18.96%
| colspan="2" style="text-align:left;" |
|-
| style="background-color:" |
| style="text-align:left;" | Karim Zeribi
| style="text-align:left;" | Miscellaneous Left
| DVG
| 
| 11.16%
| colspan="2" style="text-align:left;" |
|-
| style="background-color:" |
| style="text-align:left;" | Jean-Pierre Baumann
| style="text-align:left;" | Front National
| FN
| 
| 8.43%
| colspan="2" style="text-align:left;" |
|-
| style="background-color:" |
| style="text-align:left;" | Slimane Azzoug
| style="text-align:left;" | Democratic Movement
| MoDem
| 
| 2.80%
| colspan="2" style="text-align:left;" |
|-
| style="background-color:" |
| style="text-align:left;" | Christophe Jerez
| style="text-align:left;" | Movement for France
| MPF
| 
| 1.25%
| colspan="2" style="text-align:left;" |
|-
| style="background-color:" |
| style="text-align:left;" | Joëlle Boulay
| style="text-align:left;" | The Greens
| VEC
| 
| 1.15%
| colspan="2" style="text-align:left;" |
|-
| style="background-color:" |
| style="text-align:left;" | Michel Gruselle
| style="text-align:left;" | Far Left
| EXG
| 
| 1.03%
| colspan="2" style="text-align:left;" |
|-
| style="background-color:" |
| style="text-align:left;" | Eméa Vlaemynck
| style="text-align:left;" | Ecologist
| ECO
| 
| 0.90%
| colspan="2" style="text-align:left;" |
|-
| style="background-color:" |
| style="text-align:left;" | Hubert Savon
| style="text-align:left;" | Far Right
| EXD
| 
| 0.82%
| colspan="2" style="text-align:left;" |
|-
| style="background-color:" |
| style="text-align:left;" | Hassani Said
| style="text-align:left;" | Ecologist
| ECO
| 
| 0.65%
| colspan="2" style="text-align:left;" |
|-
| style="background-color:" |
| style="text-align:left;" | Sylvie Moyen
| style="text-align:left;" | Far Left
| EXG
| 
| 0.62%
| colspan="2" style="text-align:left;" |
|-
| style="background-color:" |
| style="text-align:left;" | André Pibarot
| style="text-align:left;" | Miscellaneous Right
| DVD
| 
| 0.50%
| colspan="2" style="text-align:left;" |
|-
| style="background-color:" |
| style="text-align:left;" | Régine Seren
| style="text-align:left;" | Independent
| DIV
| 
| 0.25%
| colspan="2" style="text-align:left;" |
|-
| style="background-color:" |
| style="text-align:left;" | Raoul Cayol
| style="text-align:left;" | Miscellaneous Right
| DVD
| 
| 0.24%
| colspan="2" style="text-align:left;" |
|-
| style="background-color:" |
| style="text-align:left;" | Marcelle Keller
| style="text-align:left;" | Independent
| DIV
| 
| 0.01%
| colspan="2" style="text-align:left;" |
|-
| colspan="8" style="background-color:#E9E9E9;"|
|- style="font-weight:bold"
| colspan="4" style="text-align:left;" | Total
| 
| 100%
| 
| 100%
|-
| colspan="8" style="background-color:#E9E9E9;"|
|-
| colspan="4" style="text-align:left;" | Registered voters
| 
| style="background-color:#E9E9E9;"|
| 
| style="background-color:#E9E9E9;"|
|-
| colspan="4" style="text-align:left;" | Blank/Void ballots
| 
| 1.44%
| 
| 4.16%
|-
| colspan="4" style="text-align:left;" | Turnout
| 
| 51.97%
| 
| 50.03%
|-
| colspan="4" style="text-align:left;" | Abstentions
| 
| 48.03%
| 
| 49.97%
|-
| colspan="8" style="background-color:#E9E9E9;"|
|- style="font-weight:bold"
| colspan="6" style="text-align:left;" | Result
| colspan="2" style="background-color:" | PS GAIN
|}

2002

 
 
 
 
 
 
|-
| colspan="8" bgcolor="#E9E9E9"|
|-

1997

 
 
 
 
 
 
|-
| colspan="8" bgcolor="#E9E9E9"|
|-

References

External links 
Results of legislative elections since 1958

4
Marseille